The 1792 English cricket season was the 21st in which matches have been awarded retrospective first-class cricket status and the sixth after the foundation of the Marylebone Cricket Club. The season saw 19 top-class matches played in the country.

Elsewhere, the earliest known cricket club in India was formed at Calcutta.

Matches 
A total of 19 top-class matches were played during the season. These included matches played by teams from Berkshire, Essex, Hampshire, Kent, Middlesex and Surrey. Club sides at Hornchurch in Essex and Brighton in Sussex also played at the top-level and MCC played eight first-class matches.

A number of matches below top-level were played, including one between Nottingham and a Leicestershire and Rutland side. A match in Sheffield may be the first in which a player is known to have been given out obstructing the field.

First mentions
First-class matches were first played at Dartford Brent and Cobham Park in Kent and at Old Field, Bray in Berkshire. A military match is known to have been played at Dublin, the first cricket known to have been played in Ireland.

Players who made their first-class cricket debuts in 1792 include:

References

Further reading
 
 
 
 

1792 in English cricket
English cricket seasons in the 18th century